Frederick I of Mecklenburg-Grabow, Duke of Mecklenburg-Grabow (13 February 1638, Schwerin – 28 April 1688, Grabow)

Life 
He was the son of Adolf Frederick I, Duke of Mecklenburg-Schwerin and his second wife Marie Katharina (1616-1665), daughter of Julius Ernst, Duke of Brunswick-Dannenberg (1571-1636).

Through his late birth, he was excluded from active government and was an "apanagierter" prince.  Via the death of his brother without issue Frederick I's three sons became ruling duke of Mecklenburg [-Schwerin] one after the other.  In 1667 Frederick became Domherr of Strasbourg Cathedral and from 1669, he lived in the family castle in Grabow.  Frederick died in a fire in the castle and was on 3 June 1725 buried in the Schelfkirche St. Nikolai in Schwerin.

Marriage and issue
On 28 May 1671 he married Christine Wilhelmine of Hesse-Homburg (30 June 1653, Bingenheim – 16 May 1722, Grabow), daughter of William Christoph of Hesse-Homburg.  They had the following children:

 Frederick William I (28 March 1675 – 31 July 1713); married Sophie Charlotte of Hesse-Kassel (July 16, 1678 – May 30, 1749), daughter of Charles I, Landgrave of Hesse-Kassel; no children.
 Carl Leopold (26 November 1678 – 28 November 1747); married Grand Duchess Ekaterina Ioanovna of Russia, (sister of Empress Anna); their daughter was Grand Duchess Anna Leopoldovna of Russia, mother of Ivan VI of Russia.
 Christian Ludwig II (15 May 1683 – 30 May 1756); married his first cousin, Duchess Gustave Caroline of Mecklenburg-Strelitz; had five children.
 Sophie Louise (6 May 1685 – 29 July 1735); third wife of Frederick I of Prussia; no children.

External links 
 
 Frederick at www.emecklenburg.de
 Stammtafel of the House of Mecklenburg 

1638 births
1688 deaths
House of Mecklenburg-Schwerin
People from Grabow